The 1983–84 Naisten SM-sarja season was the second season of the Naisten SM-sarja ice hockey league. The champion was HJK Helsinki. Silver was won by EVU Vantaa and bronze by Ilves Tampere.

Teams 

 Ilves Tampere
 Tiikerit Hämeenlinna
 Ässät Pori
 SaiPa Lappeenranta
 Teräs-Kiekko Raahe
 EVU Vantaa
 HJK Helsinki
 Jäähonka Espoo
 HIFK Helsinki
 Shakers Kerava
 Kiekko-Vesa Raahe
 Sport Vaasa

References 

Naisten Liiga (ice hockey) seasons
Naisten SM-sarja
Naisten SM-sarja